Andrew 'Andy' Charles Puddle (born 10 September 1956) is a former Welsh cricketer.  Puddle was a left-handed batsman who fielded as a wicket-keeper.  He was born in Llanrwst, Denbighshire.

Puddle made his debut for Wales Minor Counties in the 1988 MCCA Knockout Trophy against Shropshire.  He played Minor counties cricket for Wales Minor Counties from 1989 to 1994, which included 61 Minor Counties Championship matches and 7 MCCA Knockout Trophy matches. In 1993, he made his List A debut against Sussex, in the NatWest Trophy.  He played a further List A match for the team, against Middlesex in the 1994 NatWest Trophy. In his 2 List A matches, he scored 6 runs at a batting average of 3.00, with a high score of 5.

References

External links
Andy Puddle at ESPNcricinfo
Andy Puddle at CricketArchive

1956 births
Living people
Sportspeople from Conwy County Borough
Welsh cricketers
Wales National County cricketers
Wales National County cricket captains